Demetrius may be a given name.

Demetrius may also refer to:

Saints
 Saint Demetrius of Thessaloniki (270-306), Christian martyr, patron of soldiers
 Pope Demetrius I of Alexandria (189–232), Patriarch of Alexandria, contemporary of Origen
Saint Demetrius the Neomartyr of the Peloponnese (1779–1803), Christian martyr from Greece

Kings

Macedon
 Demetrius I of Macedon (336–283 BC), surnamed Poliorcetes
 Demetrius II of Macedon (276–229 BC), surnamed Aetolicus

Georgia
 Demetrius I of Georgia (1125–1156)
 Demetrius II of Georgia (1270–1289)
 Demetrius III of Georgia (1433–1446)

Bactria & India
 Demetrius I of Bactria, Greco-Bactrian king reigning from c. 200–180 BC
 Demetrius II of India, ruled briefly during the 2nd century BC
 Demetrius III Aniketos, Indo-Greek king

Seleucid Empire
 Demetrius I Soter of Syria (d. 150 BC)
 Demetrius II Nicator of Syria (d. 125 BC)
 Demetrius III Eucaerus (d. 88 BC)

Philosophers 
 Demetrius Phalereus (c.350-c.280), Athenian orator
 Demetrius Lacon (late 2nd century BC), Epicurean philosopher
 Demetrius the Cynic (1st century), Cynic philosopher of Corinth and Rome
 Demetrius of Amphipolis (4th century BC), student of Plato

Other people 
Demetrius (somatophylax) (died 330 BC), a bodyguard of Alexander the Great
 Claude Demetrius (born August 3, 1916 – May 1, 1988), an African American songwriter
 Demetrius Joyette, Canadian actor

 Demetrius of Alopece (early 4th century BC), sculptor
 Demetrius of Apamea, physiologist
 Demetrius the Fair (c. 285 BC – c. 250 BC), also known as Demetrius of Cyrene, Greek Macedonian prince and Greek Cyrenaean king
 Demetrius of Pharos (d. 214 BC), Illyrian ruler
 Demetrius the Chronographer (late 3rd century BC), Jewish historian
 Demetrius of Scepsis (2nd/3rd century BC), Greek grammarian
 Demetrius (son of Philip V) (d. 180 BC), son of Philip V of Macedon, executed by his father for treason
 Demetrius of Magnesia (1st century BC), writer
 Demetrius (Bible), the name of two people in the New Testament
 Demetrius of Antioch (3rd century), bishop of Antioch
 Demetrius Triclinius (c. 1300), Byzantine scholar of ancient Greek literature
 Demetrius Cydones (1324–1397), Byzantine prime minister and theologian
 Demetrius I Starszy (1327–1399), Prince of Bryansk

In fiction
 Demetrius (A Midsummer Night's Dream), a major character in A Midsummer Night's Dream by William Shakespeare
 Demetrius, a minor character in Titus Andronicus by William Shakespeare
 Demetrius, a minor character in Antony and Cleopatra by William Shakespeare
 Demetrius, a play by Friedrich Schiller
Demetrius and the Gladiators, a sword and sandal epic film
 Demetrios – The BIG Cyncial Adventure, a 2016 video game by COWCAT games

Churches

 Aghios Demetrios in Thessaloniki, dedicated to Saint Demetrius of Thessaloniki

Other uses
 Operation Demetrius, crackdown on paramilitary groups in Ireland by the British Army (1971–1975)

See also
 Demetrio (disambiguation)

Human name disambiguation pages